Emma Barnett (born 5 February 1985) is a British broadcaster and journalist. She has been the main presenter of Woman's Hour on BBC Radio 4 since January 2021.

Barnett worked for BBC Radio 5 Live for six years, beginning in 2014, after three years working for LBC. Between 2016 and 2020 she presented 5 Live's mid-morning weekday programme. Before beginning her broadcasting career she worked for The Daily Telegraph, first as its Digital Media editor and latterly its Women editor, being credited with bringing a more serious edge to the coverage of women's issues in the paper. Between August 2016 and 2020, she was a columnist for The Sunday Times and, from June 2017, a co-presenter of BBC One's Sunday Morning Live. In autumn 2017, she co-presented the live discussion programme After the News on ITV and between 2019 and 2022 she was one of the presenters of the BBC's flagship news and current affairs shows Newsnight.

Early life and education 
Barnett was born on 5 February 1985 in Manchester to Jewish parents, Ian, a commercial property surveyor, and Michele Barnett. She has no siblings. Her grandmother fled Wiener Neustadt, Austria, to escape the Nazis. During Barnett's teenage years, her father ran brothels in the Greater Manchester area. The family home was used for publicity shoots of some of the women and for the recording of sex films. Previously convicted of "living off immoral earnings" and subjected to a suspended sentence, in 2008 Barnett's father was sentenced to immediate imprisonment for keeping brothels and controlling the prostitution of a trafficked woman; Barnett’s mother received a suspended sentence for money laundering related to income from the brothels.

Barnett attended Manchester High School for Girls, a private school. In 2006, she graduated with a degree in History and Politics from University of Nottingham. She took a postgraduate course in journalism at the Cardiff School of Journalism, Media and Cultural Studies.

Career

Following the postgraduate course at Cardiff, Barnett began her career in journalism at Media Week in 2007 and joined The Daily Telegraph in 2009, later becoming the paper's first digital media editor, and then, from 2012, the women's editor. Barnett launched The Telegraphs digital section, "Wonder Women", in October 2012 with contributors such as Cathy Newman of Channel 4 News. She also became chair of the UJIA Jewish media network and of the UJIA Skirt Network, a networking group for Jewish women.

A radio presenter for LBC for almost three years until early 2014, Barnett joined BBC Radio 5 Live that summer. From November 2014, she presented the station's Hit List programme, a countdown of the 40 highest profile online news stories of the week. After leaving The Telegraph, Barnett started presenting the morning slot on BBC Radio 5 Live in September 2016, being the first woman to have a solo daily slot since the departure of Shelagh Fogarty and Victoria Derbyshire two years earlier in a new-look schedule.

In April 2014, Barnett was a judge for Woman's Hour (on BBC Radio 4) power list, a programme on which she had already been an occasional presenter, the youngest in the programme's history. A decade before Barnett began her role on Woman's Hour, at 17, she did work experience with its presenter, Jenni Murray. Additionally, she has made documentaries for Radio 4.

In August 2016, Barnett's 'Tough Love' agony column began in The Sunday Times Magazine. To encourage her readers to write in about difficult issues, she referred to "the most painful chapter of my life" when her father was "imprisoned for living off immoral earnings" "after pleading guilty to keeping brothels with a turnover of more than £2.5m". At her mother's related trial for money laundering, police found emails between Barnett and her father talking about his "whores".

In March 2018, Barnett began a series of podcasts for Historic England entitled Irreplaceable: A History of England in 100 Places. The podcast, presented by Barnett and Dr. Suzannah Lipscomb, was nominated for the British Podcast Awards in the 'Best Branded Content' category in April 2018.

In March 2019 she became one of the regular presenters on BBC Two's Newsnight. In 2019 her book Period. It's About Bloody Time was released, which covered her experience of endometriosis.

During December 2019, Barnett was widely criticized for her line of questioning towards Angela Rayner in an episode of the BBC's Question Time, where she referred to Labour as the "party of the big state" and asked if they would "nationalise sausages".

In September 2020 Barnett was announced as the new main presenter of Woman's Hour on BBC Radio 4.  She started presenting the programme on Monday to Thursday in January 2021.

On 6 January 2021, it was widely reported that, in her third Woman's Hour programme, Barnett was involved in an incident when she was overheard by guests after inadvertently leaving her microphone on. The conversation overheard was a discussion with her producers, concerning alleged anti-Semitic comments made by Kelechi Okafor, one of the show guests, who had been booked to talk about the legacy of the #MeToo movement and had defended similar comments made by Reggie Yates in 2017 about record company managers. Upon realising Okafor had heard the exchange, Okafor was offered the opportunity to comment on air but declined to be interviewed. Sharing the incident on Twitter moments later, Okafor said that "I'm coming off Woman's Hour because what I’ve just had to witness is absolutely degrading and vile".  Another guest booked to appear, Sarah Green, said Woman's Hour should apologise to Okafor. Barnett defended herself, saying she would have been happy to have Okafor on the show, “but equally it is my duty to ask people what qualifies them as a leading voice in a space. And about any previous issues which may influence their views”.

In February 2021, one hundred public figures signed an open letter to the BBC, organised by Yassmin Abdel-Magied and Mariam Khan, criticising what they called Barnett's "strikingly hostile" interview of Zara Mohammed, the first woman and youngest person to be elected Secretary General of the Muslim Council of Britain, and saying that her line of questioning perpetuated “damaging and prejudicial tropes” about Islam and Muslim women. Signatories included Sayeeda Warsi, Diane Abbott, Naz Shah, Deborah Frances-White, Zarah Sultana, Apsana Begum, Faiza Shaheen, Nikesh Shukla, Jordan Stephens and Amina Wadud. Woman's Hour responded to the letter, stating that they would 'reflect' on the interview, but also noted that they believed it 'legitimate... to seek to explore some of the issues facing Muslims in the UK.' The columnist and writer Kenan Malik defended Barnett's approach, stating that it was typical of Barnett's 'abrasive' style and that 'her interruptions of Mohammed revealed a willingness to subject all her interviewees to the same treatment.'

Also in 2021, Barnett interviewed Sinéad O'Connor on Woman's Hour. The interview prompted O'Connor to announce she was quitting music, though she later retracted this, stating that Barnett had been to blame: "I was already so badly triggered by the time the BBC fucked me up the ass, with no warning, lube or permission, I lost my shit after women's hour: I felt like I did thirty years ago and for thirty years. That I'd be better off (safer) if I ran away and gave up being in music at all. Because I keep getting used as a coat hanger for people to clothe with whatever they like. My legal vulnerabilities or past agonies dragged up for salacious entertainment and the paying of the mortgages of mostly men, who, thanks be to God, have never and will never know what it's like to be a female trauma survivor in this world. A world falsely claiming every day to be less poisoned by stigma or misogyny that [sic] it is in reality... Of all the shite they could have asked about they grill me on having four kids with four fathers. About being 'a horn dog'. Then Barnett dares to suggest that 'oh aren't we much better now about discussing mental health'. No, Bitch. Because if we were you wouldn’t have dragged up the madwoman in the attic scenario".

In January 2022, Barnett started a new role at Bloomberg, hosting the weekly show Emma Barnett Meets. In this role, she has interviewed prominent figures including Al Sharpton, Anthony Fauci and Tim Berners Lee.

Awards
Barnett was named in two consecutive annual lists of the Radio Academy’s 30 under 30 list. She also made the 20 under 30 Hot List feature in Red magazine in 2011. While at The Telegraph, Barnett was named Digital Journalist of the Year by the Association of Online Publishers and Digital Writer of the Year at the 2011 Online Media Awards. She was named best newcomer at the Arqiva commercial radio awards in 2012. She was named and Broadcaster of the Year in 2017 by the Political Studies Association and Radio Broadcaster of the Year in 2018 by the Broadcasting Press Guild.

Barnett won the Gold award for Best Speech Presenter at the 2022 Audio and Radio Industry Awards for her work on Woman's Hour.

Personal life
Barnett met her husband at university and married in 2012. In 2018, she had a son. She lives in London. She is not highly religiously observant, and is ambivalent about both Orthodox and Reform Judaism. In a 2014 BBC Radio segment, she expressed discomfort at women being rabbis. She carries out charity work for Norwood, one of the largest welfare organisations within the British Jewish community. Barnett is a member of the Women's Equality Party.

References

External links
 "Contributor page: Emma Barnett", The Telegraph website
 Woman's Hour (BBC Radio 4)

1985 births
Living people
21st-century British journalists
21st-century British women writers
Alumni of Cardiff University
Alumni of the University of Nottingham
BBC Radio 4 presenters
BBC Radio 5 Live presenters
BBC television presenters
British broadcasters
British columnists
British feminists
British Jews
British women columnists
British women journalists
British women podcasters
The Daily Telegraph people
English Jewish writers
People educated at Manchester High School for Girls
The Sunday Times people
Women's Equality Party people
Woman's Hour